Thaliastrasse  is a station on  of the Vienna U-Bahn. It is located in the Ottakring District. It opened in 1989. It is named after the Thalia Theature.

References

Buildings and structures in Ottakring
Railway stations opened in 1989
Vienna U-Bahn stations